This is a discography of the 1881 opera The Tales of Hoffmann by Jacques Offenbach. The list includes live and studio recordings available in audio CD, VHS and DVD.

References

Opera discographies
Operas by Jacques Offenbach